The Charles M. Schulz Museum and Research Center is a museum dedicated to the works of Charles M. Schulz, creator of the Peanuts comic strip. The museum opened on August 17, 2002, two years after Schulz died, and is in Santa Rosa, California.

The museum is home to many of the original Peanuts strips, as well as other artwork by Schulz. Two works by Japanese artist Yoshiteru Otani dominate the Great Hall: a 3.5-ton wood sculpture depicting the evolution of Snoopy and a -high ceramic mural made of 3,588 Peanuts strips which combine to form the image of Lucy van Pelt holding the football for Charlie Brown to kick it. Among the museum's permanent exhibits are a work by Christo which depicts Snoopy's doghouse wrapped, an exhibition of foreign language editions of Peanuts books, Schulz's personal studio and tributes to Schulz from other artists. Inside the museum are three rotating galleries with exhibits that change every year. The museum is open daily from 11:00 a.m. to 5:00 p.m.

Gallery

See also 
 Cartoon Art Museum – comics museum in San Francisco which presents the "Sparky Award," named in honor of Charles M. Schulz

References

External links

Michael Barrier's essay on the museum

Buildings and structures completed in 2002
Culture in the San Francisco Bay Area
Charles M. Schulz
Buildings and structures in Santa Rosa, California
Schulz, Charles
Art museums and galleries in California
Media museums in California
Cartooning museums
Art museums established in 2002
2002 establishments in California
Art in the San Francisco Bay Area
Museums in Santa Rosa, California